"Do It Again (Put Ya Hands Up)" is the lead single from rapper Jay-Z's fourth album Vol. 3... Life and Times of S. Carter. The song features production by Rockwilder, including guest vocals by Amil and Beanie Sigel.

Formats and track listings

CD
 "Do It Again (Put Ya Hands Up)" (LP Version)
 "Do It Again (Put Ya Hands Up)" (Radio Edit)
 "So Ghetto"
 "Jigga My Nigga"

Vinyl
A-side
 "Do It Again (Put Ya Hands Up)" (Radio Edit)
 "Do It Again (Put Ya Hands Up)" (Instrumental)
 "Do It Again (Put Ya Hands Up)" (LP Version)

B-side
 "So Ghetto" (Radio Edit)
 "So Ghetto" (LP Version)
 "So Ghetto" (Instrumental)

Charts

Weekly charts

References

See also
List of songs recorded by Jay-Z

2000 singles
Amil songs
Beanie Sigel songs
Jay-Z songs
Music videos directed by Dave Meyers (director)
Song recordings produced by Rockwilder
Songs written by Rockwilder
Songs written by Jay-Z
Roc-A-Fella Records singles
Songs written by Beanie Sigel
2000 songs
Songs written by Amil